WFWG may refer to:

 WFWG-LD, a low-power television station (channel 30) licensed to serve Richmond, Virginia, United States
 Windows 3.1x#Windows for Workgroups